Shimiliguda is a village in Alluri Sitharama Raju district of the Indian state of Andhra Pradesh.

Transport 
The Shimiliguda railway station in the village is on Kothavalasa-Kirandul line of Waltair railway division in East Coast Railway zone.

References

Villages in  Alluri Sitharama Raju district